is a Japanese politician of the Liberal Democratic Party, a member of the House of Representatives in the Diet (national legislature). A native of Setagaya, Tokyo, he graduated from Keio University with a degree in economics in March 1986 and from École Supérieure des Sciences Économiques et Commerciales in France in June 1991. He also received a master's degree in the history of foreign affairs in Japanese politics from the University of Tokyo in March 2005. He was elected to the House of Representatives for the first time in September 2005 after running unsuccessfully in 2003. He is affiliated to the revisionist lobby Nippon Kaigi.

Career
 Banker
 5 times elected to the House of Representatives (constituency: Tokyo Proportional - Tokyo 6 )
 State Minister of Cabinet Office
 Parliamentary Vice-Minister of Cabinet Office
 Member, Committee on Cabinet, HR
 Areas of interest: fiscal and monetary policy, economic growth strategy, Foreign Affairs and national security

Honours
 : Grand Officer of the Order of Orange-Nassau (29 October 2014)

References 

 
 Profile on LDP website: jimin.jp/english/profile/members/120991.html

External links 
  in Japanese.

1964 births
Living people
People from Setagaya
Keio University alumni
University of Tokyo alumni
ESSEC Business School alumni
Koizumi Children
Members of the House of Representatives (Japan)
Members of Nippon Kaigi
Liberal Democratic Party (Japan) politicians